Chrenovec-Brusno is a village and municipality in Prievidza District in the Trenčín Region of western Slovakia.

History 
The village was first mentioned in historical records in 1243.

Geography 
The municipality lies at an altitude of 360 metres and covers an area of 12.315 km². It has a population of about 1335 people.

Genealogical resources 
The records for genealogical research are available at the state archive "Statny Archiv in Nitra, Slovakia"

 Roman Catholic church records (births/marriages/deaths): 1698–1929 (parish A)

See also 
 List of municipalities and towns in Slovakia

References

External links 
 
 
https://web.archive.org/web/20080111223415/http://www.statistics.sk/mosmis/eng/run.html 
Surnames of living people in Chrenovec-Brusno

Villages and municipalities in Prievidza District